McKinnon's is a major city in the Major Division of North Coast, Saint John Parish, Antigua and Barbuda.

Geography 
McKinnon's Pond is located entirely within the boundaries of the town, specifically within enumeration district 31401.

Demographics 
McKinnon's has three enumeration districts.

 31300 McKinnon's
 31401 McKinnon's-S.P._1
 31402 McKinnon's-S.P._2

Features 

 Dickenson Bay

References 

Populated places in Antigua and Barbuda